József Hegedűs (7 January 1910 – 7 August 1981) was a Hungarian gymnast. He competed at the 1932 Summer Olympics and the 1936 Summer Olympics.

References

1910 births
1981 deaths
Hungarian male artistic gymnasts
Olympic gymnasts of Hungary
Gymnasts at the 1932 Summer Olympics
Gymnasts at the 1936 Summer Olympics
Gymnasts from Budapest
20th-century Hungarian people